A Walk to Remember is the debut extended play by South Korean singer Yoona. The EP was released digitally and physically on May 30, 2019, by SM Entertainment, to celebrate her 29th birthday. "Summer Night", featuring indie singer 20 Years of Age, was released as a single.

Background and release
On May 24 it was released that Im Yoon-ah will have her Korean debut EP "A Walk To Remember" with title track Summer Night on May 30, 2019.

Concept images were released from May 22 to May 27 and the music video teaser for "Summer Night" was released on May 27.

The music video, together with the EP, was released on May 30.

Singles
The song "Deoksugung Stonewall Walkway" featuring 10cm was released on March 11, 2016, as part of SM Station Season 1.

The song "When The Wind Blows" was released on September 8, 2017, as part of SM Station Season 2.

The song "To You" was released on May 13, 2018, the song was written by Im Yoon-ah and composed by Lee Sang-soon during Hyori's Homestay 2.

Commercial performance 
A Walk to Remember debuted at number 3 on the Gaon Albums Chart. It also debuted at number 47 on Billboard Japan's Top Download Albums.

The EP went on to become the third best-selling album by a female soloist of 2019, behind IU's Love Poem and bandmate Taeyeon's ''Purpose.

On the iTunes Comprehensive Album Chart, it ranked first in 10 regions around the world, including Hong Kong, Malaysia, Philippines, Singapore, Taiwan, Thailand, Vietnam, Saudi Arabia, Peru, and Chile.

Track listing

Charts

Weekly charts

Year-end charts

Sales

Release history

References 

2019 debut EPs
Korean-language EPs
SM Entertainment EPs
Pop music EPs